Eric John Hewitt FRS (27 February 1919–1 January 2002) was a British plant physiologist. He is commonly known for compiling the nutrient recipes for the Long Ashton Nutrient Solution in his landmark book on sand and water culture methods, first published in 1952 and revised in 1966.

Hewitt was educated at Whitgift School, graduated with a first-class BSc in botany and chemistry from King's College London, and completed his PhD at the University of Bristol in 1948. Hewitt's laboratory at Long Ashton Research Station opened in 1956. He was a Reader in Plant Physiology at the University of Bristol from 1967 to 1984.

He was made a Fellow of the Royal Society in 1982.

References

1919 births
2002 deaths
People educated at Whitgift School
Alumni of King's College London
Associates of King's College London
Alumni of the University of Bristol
Fellows of the Royal Society
Academics of the University of Bristol
British botanists